Illya Marchenko was the defending champion. The tournament was canceled prior to completion due to the coronavirus pandemic.

Seeds
All seeds receive a bye into the second round.

Draw

Finals

Top half

Section 1

Section 2

Bottom half

Section 3

Section 4

References

External links
Main draw

2020 ATP Challenger Tour